Mufid Said Ahmad Nashashibi (16 July 1915 – April 1999) was one of the founders of the Palestinian National Liberation League, which was established in 1942.

Born in Jerusalem, Nashashibi was educated at St. George's School in Jerusalem, the American University in Cairo and Robert College in Istanbul. In 1936, he returned to Jerusalem to work as an engineer. In 1949, he became the manager of engineering services for the United Nations Relief and Works Agency for Palestinian Refugees. In 1962, he became project manager for the construction of the Kuwait Sewage System. At first, he moved to Lebanon but, in the early 1980s, he moved to California, where he died.

References

1915 births
1999 deaths
People from Jerusalem
Palestinian engineers
National Liberation League in Palestine politicians
20th-century engineers